Christian Penigaud (born 27 February 1964 in Poitiers) is a retired male beach volleyball player from France, who competed in two consecutive Summer Olympics for his native country, starting in 1996. He became the first official European champion in men's beach volleyball, when he won the title in 1993 alongside Jean-Philippe Jodard.

Playing partners
 Jean-Philippe Jodard
 Thierry Glowacz
 Laurent Tillie
 Jean-Christian Gras

References

External links
 
 
 
 
 

1964 births
Living people
French beach volleyball players
Men's beach volleyball players
Olympic beach volleyball players of France
Beach volleyball players at the 1996 Summer Olympics
Beach volleyball players at the 2000 Summer Olympics
Sportspeople from Poitiers